Tony Montana is an American actor and film director.

Career

Professional Wrestling
Montana began acting on television in 1988 with a four year stint portraying a villain wrestling manager on Chicago’s SportsChannel most notably managing WWE Hall of Fame Superstar Abdullah the Butcher.

Acting
Montana studied acting with Bill Hickey (protege' of Uta Hagen), Tracey Roberts (protege' of Elia Kazan), Joel Asher (protege' of Sanford Meisner), David LeGrant (protege' of Lee Strasberg), and Catherine Carlen (protege' of Stella Adler).

Film

In 1996, Montana began an eight year journey producing and directing Overnight which chronicled the rise and fall of Troy Duffy, director of The Boondock Saints.  The film documents Duffy's clash with Miramax co-founder Harvey Weinstein and subsequent blacklisting in Hollywood.  Premiering at the 2004 Sundance Film Festival, Overnight was theatrically released in North America, Australia, Germany, Denmark, the United Kingdom and Russia.

The film received two thumbs up on At the Movies with Roger Ebert proclaiming it "the best documentary about Hollywood I have seen". Screen International recommended Overnight as "a must-see for anyone in the film business and a necessary addition to any film school curriculum".  In an editorial in the same issue titled "Let It Be A Warning To Us All", Mike Goodridge described Duffy's flameout as "the well-deserved fall of a 25 year-old man whose monumental ego is one of the most memorable movie monsters in years".

Roger Ebert
Montana was one of the first independent filmmakers the late film critic Roger Ebert tweeted about when social media site Twitter first launched in 2006.  After attending the 2008 Palm Springs International Festival of Short Films screening of Rebuilt, Ebert tweeted "A flawless performance by Tony Montana". Of Montana's 2010 short film Discover, Ebert tweeted "How powerful can a 90-second film be?"

Personal life

In 2017, Montana accused actor Kevin Spacey of having sexually assaulted him in 2003.  The story was reported by Fox News, the Los Angeles Times, The Huffington Post, and USA Today.  Montana was extensively interviewed on camera for the November 10, 2017 edition of ABC News Nightline.

In the December 13, 2017 issue of Variety, Montana stood alongside other victims of sexual assault, including actresses Natasha Henstridge, Leeann Tweeden and Erika Rosenbaum. In the article, titled "Justice League", Montana  was optimistic about the #MeToo movement, saying, “Fortunately the tide is turning and the monsters are being vanquished. It is indeed a reckoning."

In a 2013 interview with Little White Lies magazine, Montana revealed he has had relationships with Academy Award winner Angelina Jolie, Boxing Helena director Jennifer Lynch, Madonna's clothing designer Leslie Hamel, and adult film star Bobbi Bliss.

In 1983, Montana earned his 5th degree black belt in Chinese Kenpo Karate.

Filmography

Hard Truths (2020)
The Final Sin (2018) - Julien
We Don't Exist (2016) 
Kay.Fabe (2011) - Himself
Mr. Dupree (2011) - Himself
Discover (2009)
Rebuilt (2008) - Sam
Best Friend (2005) 
Overnight (2003) - Himself
3AM Eternal (2001) - Tyler
The Boondock Saints (1999) - The Pants

References

External links
 

Living people
American documentary film directors
Professional wrestling managers and valets
American film producers
Place of birth missing (living people)
Year of birth missing (living people)
American male screenwriters
American theatre directors
American male actors